Ouham-Fafa is a prefecture in Central African Republic. With an area of 32,530 km2, the prefecture had a population of 225,479 in 2022. Batangafo is the capital of Ouham-Fafa.

History 
Ouham-Fafa was founded on 10 December 2020 under administrative reforms.  Previously all of Ouham-Fafa's territories were part of Ouham Prefecture.

Administration 
Ouham Fafa was divided into 4 sub-prefectures and 11 communes

References 

Prefectures of the Central African Republic
States and territories established in 2020